Croton californicus is a species of croton known by the common name California croton. This plant is native to California, Nevada, Utah, Arizona, and Baja California, where it grows in the deserts and along the coastline.

This plant is a perennial or small shrub not exceeding a meter in height. The plant produces long oval-shaped leaves a few centimeters long and covered in a light-colored coat of hairs.

This species is dioecious, with individual plants bearing either male (staminate) or female (pistillate) flowers, both only a few millimeters across. The staminate flowers are tiny cups filled with thready yellowish stamens and the pistillate flowers are the rounded, lobed immature fruits surrounded by tiny pointed sepals.

References
 Welsh, et al. A Utah Flora, 3rd ed. (Brigham Young University, 2003), p. 312

External links
Jepson Manual Treatment — Croton californicus
USDA Plants Profile: Croton californicus
Croton californicus Photo gallery

californicus
Flora of California
Flora of Baja California
Flora of Nevada
Flora of Utah
Flora of the California desert regions
Flora of the Sonoran Deserts
Flora of the Great Basin
Natural history of the Mojave Desert
Dioecious plants
Flora without expected TNC conservation status